Michael Timothy Coles  (born 11 August 1965 in Exeter, England), is a former international speedway rider from England. Michael rode for a number of teams including Exeter Falcons, Edinburgh Monarchs and ended his career after riding with the Glasgow Tigers in the Premier League.

Coles has represented England at test level.

Personal life
Michael Coles is the father of professional rider Connor Coles and the son of former rider Bob Coles.

References 

1965 births
Living people
British speedway riders
English motorcycle racers
Sportspeople from Exeter
Belle Vue Aces riders
Exeter Falcons riders
Mildenhall Fen Tigers riders
Oxford Cheetahs riders
King's Lynn Stars riders
Berwick Bandits riders
Edinburgh Monarchs riders
Newport Wasps riders
Stoke Potters riders